Orthogonius is a genus of beetles in the family Carabidae, containing the following species:

 Orthogonius acrogonus Wiedemann, 1819 
 Orthogonius acutangulus Chaudoir, 1878 
 Orthogonius adoriae Tian & Deuve, 2006 
 Orthogonius aemulus Peringuey, 1896 
 Orthogonius alternans Wiedemann, 1823 
 Orthogonius alutaceus Quedenfeldt, 1883 
 Orthogonius andrewesi Emden, 1928 
 Orthogonius andrewesianus Tian & Deuve, 2006
 Orthogonius angkor Tian & Deuve, 2006 
 Orthogonius angustus Chaudoir, 1871 
 Orthogonius annamensis Jedlicka, 1965 
 Orthogonius annamicola Tian & Deuve, 2006 
 Orthogonius annemariae Tian & Deuve, 2006 
 Orthogonius assamensis Tian & Deuve, 2006 
 Orthogonius assamicola Tian & Deuve, 2006 
 Orthogonius assmuthi Wasmann, 1920 
 Orthogonius baconi Chaudoir, 1871 
 Orthogonius balthasari Jedlicka, 1935 
 Orthogonius batesi Tian & Deuve, 2003 
 Orthogonius batesianus Tian & Deuve, 2007 
 Orthogonius batesioides Tian & Deuve, 2006 
 Orthogonius baumi Jedlicka, 1955 
 Orthogonius becqueti Burgeon, 1937 
 Orthogonius bicolor Jedlicka, 1965 
 Orthogonius borneoensis Tian & Deuve, 2006 
 Orthogonius brancuccii Tian & Deuve, 2006 
 Orthogonius brevilabris H.Kolbe, 1889 
 Orthogonius brevithorax Dejean, 1825 
 Orthogonius bruggei Tian & Deuve, 2006 
 Orthogonius buqueti Chaudoir, 1850 
 Orthogonius burckhardti Tian & Deuve, 2006 
 Orthogonius burmanensis Tian & Deuve, 2006 
 Orthogonius caffer Boheman, 1848 
 Orthogonius cambodgensis Tian & Deuve, 2006 
 Orthogonius canaraensis Tian & Deuve, 2006 
 Orthogonius canaraicola Tian & Deuve, 2006 
 Orthogonius capucinus Boheman, 1848 
 Orthogonius carbonicolor Tian & Deuve, 2006 
 Orthogonius celebesicus Tian & Deuve, 2006 
 Orthogonius chaudoiri Tian & Deuve, 2001 
 Orthogonius cheni Tian & Deuve, 2001 
 Orthogonius chiangensis Tian & Deuve, 2006 
 Orthogonius clarkei Murray, 1858 
 Orthogonius confusus Tian & Deuve, 2006 
 Orthogonius constanti Tian & Deuve, 2006 
 Orthogonius coomani Tian & Deuve, 2006 
 Orthogonius coracinus H.Kolbe, 1896 
 Orthogonius crassicrus Chaudoir, 1871 
 Orthogonius cruralis Putzeys In Chaudoir, 1871 
 Orthogonius curvatus Tian & Deuve, 2006 
 Orthogonius cyclothorax Tian & Deuve, 2007
 Orthogonius davidi Chaudoir, 1878
 Orthogonius deletus Schmidt-Gobel, 1846
 Orthogonius dispar Bates, 1892 
 Orthogonius dohertyi Tian & Deuve, 2006 
 Orthogonius dongnanya Tian & Deuve, 2006 
 Orthogonius doriae Putzeys In Chaudoir, 1871 
 Orthogonius drescheri Liebke, 1937 
 Orthogonius drumonti Tian & Deuve, 2006 
 Orthogonius duboisi Tian & Deuve, 2006 
 Orthogonius duplicatus Wiedemann, 1819 
 Orthogonius dupuisi Basilewsky, 1948 
 Orthogonius dureli Tian & Deuve, 2005 
 Orthogonius edentatus Tian & Deuve, 2006 
 Orthogonius elisabethanus Burgeon, 1937 
 Orthogonius emarginatus Tian & Deuve, 2007
 Orthogonius equimarginalis Tian & Deuve, 2006 
 Orthogonius fairmairei Tian & Deuve, 2006 
 Orthogonius feai Tian & Deuve, 2007 
 Orthogonius femoralis Chaudoir, 1848 
 Orthogonius flavipes Deuve, 2004 
 Orthogonius flavus Jedlicka, 1964 
 Orthogonius foersteri Andrewes, 1931 
 Orthogonius foveiclypeus Tian & Deuve, 2004 
 Orthogonius fryi Tian & Deuve, 2006 
 Orthogonius fugax Chaudoir, 1871 
 Orthogonius gracilipes Tian & Deuve, 2006 
 Orthogonius gracilis Tian & Deuve, 2006 
 Orthogonius grootaerti Tian & Deuve, 2006 
 Orthogonius hageni Oberthur, 1883 
 Orthogonius himalaya Tian & Deuve, 2006 
 Orthogonius himalayicus Tian & Deuve, 2005 
 Orthogonius hirtulus Tian & Deuve, 2006 
 Orthogonius hirtus Chaudoir, 1871 
 Orthogonius hopei Gray, 1832
 Orthogonius huananoides Tian & Deuve, 2006 
 Orthogonius huananus Tian & Deuve, 2001 
 Orthogonius hypocrita Chaudoir, 1871 
 Orthogonius hypocritoides Jedlicka, 1935 
 Orthogonius impunctipennis Quedenfeldt, 1883 
 Orthogonius indicus Tian & Deuve, 2006 
 Orthogonius indophilus Tian & Deuve, 2006 
 Orthogonius inexpectatus Tian & Deuve, 2006 
 Orthogonius inops Chaudoir, 1871 
 Orthogonius insularis Chaudoir, 1871 
 Orthogonius intermedius Chaudoir, 1871 
 Orthogonius javanus Tian & Deuve, 2006 
 Orthogonius jianfengling Tian & Deuve, 2001 
 Orthogonius kalimantanensis Tian & Deuve, 2006 
 Orthogonius kapiriensis Burgeon, 1937 
 Orthogonius katangensis Burgeon, 1937 
 Orthogonius kickeli H.Kolbe, 1896 
 Orthogonius klickai Jedlicka, 1935 
 Orthogonius kubani Tian & Deuve, 2006 
 Orthogonius kumatai Habu, 1979
 Orthogonius lancangjiang Tian & Deuve, 2006 
 Orthogonius lao Tian & Deuve, 2006 
 Orthogonius latreillei Tian & Deuve, 2006 
 Orthogonius latus Hope, 1842 
 Orthogonius ledouxi Tian & Deuve, 2006 
 Orthogonius legrandi Tian & Deuve, 2006 
 Orthogonius lieftincki Andrewes, 1936 
 Orthogonius loeicus Tian & Deuve, 2006 
 Orthogonius loeiensis Tian & Deuve, 2006 
 Orthogonius longicornis Chaudoir, 1871 
 Orthogonius longipennis Hope, 1842 
 Orthogonius longiphallus Tian & Deuve, 2005 
 Orthogonius lucidus Bates, 1891 
 Orthogonius luzonicus Chaudoir, 1871 
 Orthogonius maindronianus Tian & Deuve, 2006 
 Orthogonius makiling Tian & Deuve, 2006 
 Orthogonius malacca Tian & Deuve, 2006 
 Orthogonius malaisei Andrewes, 1947 
 Orthogonius malaya Tian & Deuve, 2006 
 Orthogonius malaysiaensis Tian & Deuve, 2006 
 Orthogonius medanensis Tian & Deuve, 2006 
 Orthogonius mekongensis Tian & Deuve, 2006 
 Orthogonius melanipes Tian & Deuve, 2006 
 Orthogonius mellyi Chaudoir, 1850 
 Orthogonius minimus Tian & Deuve, 2006 
 Orthogonius mniszechi Chaudoir, 1871 
 Orthogonius moestus Chaudoir, 1871 
 Orthogonius monolophus Andrewes, 1931 
 Orthogonius montanus Tian & Deuve, 2006 
 Orthogonius morvani Tian & Deuve, 2003 
 Orthogonius mouhoti Chaudoir, 1871 
 Orthogonius myanmarensis Tian & Deuve, 2006 
 Orthogonius nahaeo Tian & Deuve, 2006 
 Orthogonius nepalensis Habu, 1979
 Orthogonius nepalicus Tian & Deuve, 2006 
 Orthogonius niger Jedlicka, 1935 
 Orthogonius nigripes Tian & Deuve, 2001 
 Orthogonius nyassicus H.Kolbe, 1896 
 Orthogonius obliquepes Tian & Deuve, 2006 
 Orthogonius opacus Schmidt-Gobel, 1846
 Orthogonius orphnodes Andrewes, 1930 
 Orthogonius ovatulus Tian & Deuve, 2003 
 Orthogonius ovatus Chaudoir, 1878 
 Orthogonius pachlatkoi Tian & Deuve, 2006 
 Orthogonius palangbangensis Tian & Deuve, 2006 
 Orthogonius panghongae Tian & Deuve, 2006 
 Orthogonius pangi Tian & Deuve, 2006 
 Orthogonius parallelus Chaudoir, 1871 
 Orthogonius parastantoni Tian & Deuve, 2006 
 Orthogonius parasuturalis Tian & Deuve, 2006 
 Orthogonius parcepunctatus H.Kolbe, 1896 
 Orthogonius paris Tian & Deuve, 2006 
 Orthogonius parvus Chaudoir, 1871 
 Orthogonius perakensis Tian & Deuve, 2006 
 Orthogonius perakicus Tian & Deuve, 2007 
 Orthogonius perpuncticollis Burgeon, 1937 
 Orthogonius petiolaris Tian & Deuve, 2006 
 Orthogonius piceus Chaudoir, 1871 
 Orthogonius picilabris W.S.Macleay, 1825 
 Orthogonius picipennis Chaudoir, 1871 
 Orthogonius pinguis Murray, 1858 
 Orthogonius planiger (Walker, 1858) 
 Orthogonius plebius Tian & Deuve, 2006 
 Orthogonius poggii Tian & Deuve, 2007 
 Orthogonius politus Chaudoir, 1871 
 Orthogonius pollinctor Basilewsky, 1948 
 Orthogonius pradieri Chaudoir, 1871 
 Orthogonius pseudocheni Tian & Deuve, 2006 
 Orthogonius pseudolongicornis Tian & Deuve, 2006 
 Orthogonius punctatellus Tian & Deuve, 2006 
 Orthogonius punctulatus Chaudoir, 1871 
 Orthogonius putzeysi Tian & Deuve, 2006 
 Orthogonius quadrisetosus Tian & Deuve, 2006 
 Orthogonius rhodesianus Csiki, 1932 
 Orthogonius rhodesiensis Lorenz, 1998 
 Orthogonius ribbei Tian & Deuve, 2003 
 Orthogonius rotundatus Tian & Deuve, 2006 
 Orthogonius rufiventris Bates, 1892 
 Orthogonius rufotestaceus G.Muller, 1941 
 Orthogonius sabahensis Tian & Deuve, 2006 
 Orthogonius salvazai Tian & Deuve, 2006 
 Orthogonius sarawakensis Tian & Deuve, 2006 
 Orthogonius saundersi Andrewes, 1926 
 Orthogonius schaumi Chaudoir, 1871 
 Orthogonius schaumioides Tian & Deuve, 2006 
 Orthogonius schauteni Tian & Deuve, 2006 
 Orthogonius schmidtgoebeli Chaudoir, 1871 
 Orthogonius senegalensis Dejean, 1831 
 Orthogonius siamensis Tian & Deuve, 2006 
 Orthogonius simplicatus Tian & Deuve, 2006 
 Orthogonius singaporensis Tian & Deuve, 2006 
 Orthogonius sinuatiphallus Tian & Deuve, 2001 
 Orthogonius smetsi Tian & Deuve, 2006 
 Orthogonius solidicornis Tian & Deuve, 2003 
 Orthogonius solidus Tian & Deuve, 2006 
 Orthogonius spinosus Burgeon, 1937 
 Orthogonius srilankaicus Tian & Deuve, 2003 
 Orthogonius stantoni Tian & Deuve, 2006 
 Orthogonius sterbai Jedlicka, 1935 
 Orthogonius stygius Andrewes, 1930 
 Orthogonius sulawesicus Tian & Deuve, 2003 
 Orthogonius sulcatoides Tian & Deuve, 2006 
 Orthogonius sulcatus Schmidt-Goebel, 1846 
 Orthogonius sumatraicus Tian & Deuve, 2006 
 Orthogonius suturalis Chaudoir, 1871 
 Orthogonius tangsen Tian & Deuve, 2006 
 Orthogonius tenasserimensis Tian & Deuve, 2006 
 Orthogonius termiticola Wasmann, 1902 
 Orthogonius thaicus Tian & Deuve, 2003
 Orthogonius thaiensis Tian & Deuve, 2006 
 Orthogonius thailandensis Tian & Deuve, 2006 
 Orthogonius thoracicus Gestro, 1875 
 Orthogonius tikekee Tian & Deuve, 2006 
 Orthogonius tonkinensis Tian & Deuve, 2006 
 Orthogonius tonkinicus Tian & Deuve, 2006 
 Orthogonius travancore Tian & Deuve, 2006 
 Orthogonius tricarinatus Burgeon, 1937 
 Orthogonius uncipennis Tian & Deuve, 2006 
 Orthogonius virgulatus Andrewes, 1931 
 Orthogonius wallardiensis Tian & Deuve, 2006 
 Orthogonius xanthomerus L. Redtenbacher, 1867
 Orthogonius yoga Tian & Deuve, 2006 
 Orthogonius yunnanensis Tian & Deuve, 2001

References

 
Orthogoniinae